Textile Center Building is a 12-story Gothic Revival and Italian Renaissance Revival architectural styled brick building located in the Los Angeles Fashion District.  Designed by William Douglas Lee in the Gothic Revival style, the building opened in 1926 as a center for garment manufacturing.  It has since been converted to condominiums.

Construction and operation
The Textile Center Building was developed by Florence C. Casler, a pioneering woman real estate developer and contractor. When the building was completed, Casler maintained her office there during the height of her career. In April 1926, the Los Angeles Times reported on the building's opening as follows:"More than 6000 people were present at the formal opening of the new Textile Center Building, the new loft building on the corner of Eighth and Maple, built and owned by Lloyd & Casler, Inc., and catering exclusively to the wholesale garment manufacturers of the city." As part of the grand opening, a fashion show was conducted featuring wearing apparel manufactured in Los Angeles. It stated that the building was 100% rented to 56 tenants with gross annual income of $92,584 against expenses of $22,394.61, for net earnings of $70,189.39.

The building was sold in 1945 for $450,000.

Conversion to loft-style condominiums
In 2005, the building was converted into loft-style condominiums. The project was part of MJW Investments' $130 million conversion of nine former garment buildings into live/work lofts and retail space. In 2006, the Los Angeles Business Journal reported that the building was "being filled with modern loft dwellers seeking an urban lifestyle."

Historic designations
The Textile Center Building has been recognized as a historic building at both the local and national levels. In April 2002, it was designated a Historic Cultural Monument (No. 712) by the Los Angeles Cultural Heritage Commission.  And in 2005 it was listed in the National Register of Historic Places.

See also
List of Registered Historic Places in Los Angeles
Florence Casler

References

External links
 Textile Center Building website
 Image of the Textile Center Building in the process of being modernized, Los Angeles, California, 1935. Los Angeles Times Photographic Archive (Collection 1429). UCLA Library Special Collections, Charles E. Young Research Library, University of California, Los Angeles.

Buildings and structures in Downtown Los Angeles
Manufacturing plants in the United States
Residential skyscrapers in Los Angeles
Residential condominiums in the United States
Los Angeles Historic-Cultural Monuments
Commercial buildings on the National Register of Historic Places in Los Angeles
Commercial buildings completed in 1926
1926 establishments in California
1920s architecture in the United States
Gothic Revival architecture in California
Italian Renaissance Revival architecture in the United States
Renaissance Revival architecture in California